The 2019–20 National T20 Cup was a Twenty20 domestic cricket competition that was played in Faisalabad, Punjab, Pakistan from 13 to 24 October 2019. Lahore Whites were the defending champions. It was the sixteenth season of the National T20 Cup in Pakistan, and took place during a break in Pakistan's domestic first-class tournament, the 2019–20 Quaid-e-Azam Trophy.  The same six teams playing in the Quaid-e-Azam Trophy played in the T20 Cup, with the top four teams progressing to the semi-finals.

Following the conclusion of the round-robin stage, Northern, Balochistan, Southern Punjab and Khyber Pakhtunkhwa finished in the top four places in the group. Northern were drawn against Khyber Pakhtunkhwa in the first semi-final, with Balochistan drawn against Southern Punjab in the second semi-final.

In the first semi-final, Northern beat Khyber Pakhtunkhwa by three runs. In the second semi final, Balochistan beat Southern Punjab by three wickets to advance to the final. Northern won the tournament, beating Balochistan by 52 runs in the final. Khyber Pakhtunkhwa's Mohammad Rizwan was named the player of the tournament, for scoring 215 runs and taking six wickets.

Points table

Fixtures

Round-robin

Finals

References

External links
 Series home at ESPN Cricinfo

2019 in Pakistani cricket
2019 in Punjab, Pakistan
21st century in Faisalabad
Cricket in Faisalabad
Domestic cricket competitions in 2019–20 
2019–20 National T20 Cup
October 2019 sports events in Pakistan
Pakistani cricket seasons from 2000–01